KWAT (950 AM) is a radio station broadcasting a news/talk format serving the Watertown, South Dakota area. The station is owned and operated by Alpha Media after it purchased the stations of Digity, LLC.

References

External links
Watertown Radio

WAT
Radio stations established in 1940
1940 establishments in South Dakota
News and talk radio stations in the United States
Codington County, South Dakota